The Allerum Open is a women's professional golf tournament on the Swedish Golf Tour and LET Access Series, played since 2018 at Allerum Golf Club in Helsingborg, Sweden.

Winners

References

External links

LET Access Series events
Swedish Golf Tour (women) events